Robert A. Johnson (September 29, 1921 – December 11, 2014) was an American politician in the state of South Dakota. He was a member of the South Dakota State Senate. Born in Chicago, Illinois, Johnson grew up on a farm in Groton, South Dakota. He was an alumnus of South Dakota State University and was a farmer and insurance agent. He died on December 11, 2014.

References

1921 births
2014 deaths
People from Groton, South Dakota
Politicians from Chicago
South Dakota State University alumni
Businesspeople from South Dakota
Farmers from South Dakota
Democratic Party South Dakota state senators
20th-century American businesspeople